Yalda (also spelled Yelda) is a town in southern Syria, administratively part of the Rif Dimashq Governorate, located on the southern outskirts of Damascus to the west of the Yarmouk Camp. Nearby localities include al-Hajar al-Aswad, Jaramana, Sayyidah Zaynab, al-Sabinah and Babbila. According to the Syria Central Bureau of Statistics, Yalda had a population of 28,384 in the 2004 census. The town is also in the Babbila nahiyah consisting of 13 towns and villages with a combined population of 341,625.

History
The town has ancient ruins including foundations of hewn stone and Corinthian columns of basalt.

Yalda was visited by Syrian geographer Yaqut al-Hamawi in the early 13th-century, during Ayyubid rule. He noted that it was "a village lying some 3 miles from Damascus. The final n is sometimes left out, and the name pronounced Yalda."

References

Bibliography

External links
google map

Populated places in Markaz Rif Dimashq District